Surry County is a county in the Commonwealth of Virginia. As of the 2020 census, the population was 6,561.

In 1652, Surry County was formed from the portion of James City County south of the James River. For more than 350 years it has depended on an agricultural economy. The county has 19 sites listed on the National Register, including a landmark occupied in 1676 known as Bacon's Castle and Chippokes Plantation (now a state park). The Jamestown Ferry provides easy access to Virginia's Historic Triangle, featuring Jamestown, Williamsburg, and Yorktown, linked by the National Park Service's Colonial Parkway.

The county is known for farming, curing Virginia Hams, and harvesting lumber, notably Virginia pine.

History
During the times of the Virginia Colony, Surry County was formed in 1652 from a portion of James City County (one of the original 8 counties formed in 1634) south of the James River. It was named for the English county of Surrey. Surry County initially consisted of two parishes of the Church of England: Lawne's Creek and Southwark.

Nearby, in 1665, Arthur Allen built a Jacobean brick house. A decade later it became known as Bacon's Castle because it was occupied as a fort or "castle" during Bacon's Rebellion against the Royal Governor, Sir William Berkeley. (Nathaniel Bacon never lived at Bacon's Castle, but rather at Curles Neck Plantation in Henrico County, about 30 miles upriver on the James River's northern bank).

The first town, Cobham, was established in 1691 at the mouth of Gray's Creek, where it flows into the James River. Neighboring Sussex County was formed from the southwestern end of Surry County in 1754. After the American Revolutionary War, during which Tarleton's raiders looted the county, Surry County became part of the new Commonwealth of Virginia, one of the first 13 United States.

During the American Civil War, the Confederate Army included the Surry Light Artillery and the Surry Cavalry.

In 1873, a New Jersey timberman, David Steele, with financing from Baltimore interests, began a lumber business in Surry County but went bankrupt a decade later. Baltimore investors Waters and Company incorporated the Surry Lumber Company in 1885. In 1886 it incorporated the Surry, Sussex, and Southampton Railway, which delivered lumber to Scotland wharf on the James River (now the Jamestown Ferry terminal). The company (headquartered at Sedley, Virginia) and SS&S railroad grew, reaching their heyday around 1920. But the company did not replant after it cut the old-growth pine, and found further logging in the area difficult after 1925.

In 1927, it closed its mills in Dendron, Virginia, causing considerable economic distress in the county. The railway went bankrupt in 1930. Gray Lumber Company of Waverly, Virginia, which replanted its timber cuts, bought 15,000 acres from the Surry Lumber Company in 1941, and other companies soon bought the rest of the company's acreage.

The Temperance, Industrial and Collegiate Institute, a school for African Americans, was located in Surry County from 1892 to 1928. A Virginia State Historic Marker is located at the site of the former campus in Claremont, and a memorial to the school's founded, John Jefferson Smallwood, is located at the Abundant Life Church Cemetery in Spring Grove.  

As part of Virginia's "Massive Resistance" to integration following Brown v. Board of Education, Surry County closed its white public schools so no black students could attend. Foundation's School, a private, whites-only school was established. Grants and other provisions were made to provide public support for private education for the white students affected.

The two-unit Surry Nuclear Power Plant was commissioned in 1972 and 1973 and is expected to remain active until 2053.

Transportation

Major highways
 
 
 
 

State Route 31 and State Route 40 bisect the county. Its major artery is the historic path along the south bank of the James River now known as State Route 10 between Prince George County and Isle of Wight County.

Geography

Adjacent counties
Charles City County (northwest)
Isle of Wight County (southeast)
James City County (northeast)
Prince George County (west)
Southampton County (south)
Sussex County (southwest)

Demographics

2020 census

Note: the US Census treats Hispanic/Latino as an ethnic category. This table excludes Latinos from the racial categories and assigns them to a separate category. Hispanics/Latinos can be of any race.

2010 Census
As of the census of 2010, there were 7,058 people, 2,619 households, and 1,917 families residing in the county.  The population density was 24 people per square mile (9/km2).  There were 3,294 housing units at an average density of 12 per square mile (5/km2).  The racial makeup of the county was 51.3% White, 46.1% Black or African American, 0.3% Native American, 0.3% Asian, 0.0% Pacific Islander, 0.3% from other races, and 1.7% from two or more races.  1.2% of the population were Hispanic or Latino of any race.

There were 2,619 households, out of which 30.50% had children under the age of 18 living with them, 55.50% were married couples living together, 14.10% had a female householder with no husband present, and 26.80% were non-families. 23.70% of all households were made up of individuals, and 10.10% had someone living alone who was 65 years of age or older.  The average household size was 2.61 and the average family size was 3.09.

In the county, the age distribution of the population shows 25.20% under the age of 18, 7.20% from 18 to 24, 27.80% from 25 to 44, 25.70% from 45 to 64, and 14.10% who were 65 years of age or older.  The median age was 39 years. For every 100 females, there were 93.70 males.  For every 100 females age 18 and over, there were 92.00 males.

The median income for a household in the county was $37,558, and the median income for a family was $41,234. Males had a median income of $31,123 versus $21,143 for females. The per capita income for the county was $16,682.  About 9.70% of families and 10.80% of the population were below the poverty line, including 13.40% of those under age 18 and 14.80% of those age 65 or over.

Public services 
Blackwater Regional Library is the regional library system that provides services to the citizens of Surry.

Communities

Towns
Claremont
Dendron
Surry

Census-designated place
Scotland

Other unincorporated communities
Bacon's Castle
Cabin Point
Carsley
Elberon
Spring Grove

Politics

Recent events

Dog fighting investigation 

Beginning on April 25, 2007, Surry County Sheriff Harold D. Brown and part-time county Commonwealth's Attorney (prosecutor) Gerald G. Poindexter led a high-profile dog fighting investigation.  Authorities investigating Davon T. Boddie, 26, on a narcotics issue found evidence of dogfighting activities at home and property in Surry County where he lived.  It was owned by his cousin, then Atlanta Falcons NFL-football player Michael Vick. Officials confiscated 66 dogs, 55 of which were pit bulls, and other evidence. An ESPN source alleged that Vick was a "heavyweight" in dogfighting and had been known to wager $40,000 on the outcome of a single fight.

By August 20, 2007, all the defendants charged in Federal court, including Vick, had agreed to guilty pleas under plea bargain agreements.  They were sentenced to terms ranging from 6 to 23 months, to be served in federal prisons. The abused dogs were placed in foster or adoptive homes.

On February 26, 2009, Vick was approved for release to home confinement.  He was released on 21 May 2009 to be confined for the remainder of his 23-month term of imprisonment under home confinement.

Points of interest 
Bacon's Castle
Chippokes Plantation State Park
Jamestown-Scotland Ferry
National Register of Historic Places listings in Surry County, Virginia
Surry County Courthouse Complex
Surry Nuclear Power Plant

Notable people
Leslie Garland Bolling (1898–1955), Early 20th century African-American woodcarver
Robert Butler (1784–1853), European-American politician and physician; served as Adjutant General of Virginia and State Treasurer of Virginia
John Hartwell Cocke (1780–1866), European-American military officer, planter, and businessman
Joseph T. Deal (1860–1942), Virginia politician and businessman
Curtis W. Harris (1924–2017), minister, civil rights activist, and politician in Virginia
Thomas Person (1733–1800), European-American politician and Anti-Federalist organizer
Peyton Short (1761–1825), land speculator and politician in Kentucky
Claude V. Spratley (1882–1976), Virginia jurist
 Karen Huger, Real Housewives of Potomac personality.

References

External links

 

 
Virginia counties
1652 establishments in Virginia
Counties on the James River (Virginia)
Populated places established in 1652